Kellerhoff is a German language surname. Notable people with the name include:

 Bernhard Kellerhoff (1900–1978), German footballer
 Sven Felix Kellerhoff (1971), German historian, journalist and author

References 

German-language surnames